Parikhan Khanum (16th-century) was a daughter of shah Ismail I of Persia (r. 1501–1524).

She was born to Tajlu Khanum and was the sister of Mahinbanu Sultan. Alongside her mother and sister, she participated actively in politics during the reign of her father.

References

 

16th-century births
16th-century deaths
16th-century Iranian women
Safavid princesses